New Castle Historic District may refer to:

New Castle Historic District (New Castle, Delaware)
New Castle Historic District (New Castle, Virginia)